Isostola albiplaga is a moth of the family Erebidae. It was described by Hering in 1925. It is found in Colombia.

References

Arctiinae
Moths described in 1925
Endemic fauna of Colombia
Moths of South America